High Gun (foaled 1951 in Kentucky) was an American Champion Thoroughbred racehorse.

Background
His sire, Heliopolis, was a two-time Leading sire in North America. His dam was Rocket Gun whose damsire was Man o' War.

Trainer Max Hirsch purchased High Gun for Robert J. Kleberg's King Ranch for $10,200 at the 1952 Keeneland Yearling Sale.

Racing career
In 1954 High Gun was the best Three-Year-Old colt in the United States, winning the Peter Pan Handicap, Dwyer Stakes, the third leg of the U.S. Triple Crown series, the Belmont Stakes, and then beat older horses in the Manhattan Handicap, Sysonby Mile, and Jockey Club Gold Cup. In November of that year, an injury kept High Gun out of the prestigious Washington, D.C. International Stakes won by Fisherman, a colt High Gun had beaten in June's Belmont Stakes and October's Jockey Club Gold Cup. High Gun was voted the 1954 American Champion Three-Year-Old Male Horse. 

Racing at age four in 1955, High Gun continued his winning ways, capturing two of the New York Handicap Triple races, the Metropolitan and Brooklyn, and was second in the third, the Suburban. That year he followed Tom Fool as the only horses to ever win the Sysonby Mile twice, doing it by defeating the great Nashua. High Gun was voted his second Champion's title as the 1955 American Champion Older Male Horse.

Stud record
After three years of racing, High Gun was retired to stud duty but was not successful.

References
 October 3, 1955 Sports Illustrated story on Max Hirsch and High Gun

1951 racehorse births
Racehorses bred in Kentucky
Racehorses trained in the United States
American Champion racehorses
Belmont Stakes winners
Thoroughbred family 1-h